Wilsonosaura josyi is a species of lizard in the family Gymnophthalmidae. It is endemic to Peru. It is monotypic in the genus Wilsonosaura.

References

Gymnophthalmidae
Reptiles of Peru
Endemic fauna of Peru
Taxobox binomials not recognized by IUCN